Larisa Sergukhina (born 16 September 1965) is a member of the Novgorod regional parliament for the United Russia party. She has been pictured with Vladimir Putin on several occasions.

References

Living people
1965 births
United Russia politicians
21st-century Russian women politicians
People from Novgorod Oblast
Place of birth missing (living people)